The Episcopal Divinity School (EDS) is a theological school in New York City that trains students for service with the Episcopal Church. It is affiliated with Union Theological Seminary. Students who enroll in the EDS at Union Anglican studies program earn a Master of Divinity degree from Union and also fulfill requirements for ordination in the Episcopal Church. It is led by Dean Kelly Brown Douglas. Known throughout the Anglican Communion for progressive teaching and action on issues of civil rights and social justice, its faculty and students were directly involved in many of the social controversies surrounding the Episcopal Church in the latter half of the 20th century and at the start of the 21st.

Until 2017, EDS was a seminary of the Episcopal Church based in Cambridge, Massachusetts, United States. As an independent seminary, EDS offered Master of Divinity (M.Div.), Master of Arts in Theological Studies (MATS), and Doctor of Ministry (D.Min.) degree programs, as well as a certificate in Anglican studies program. It had a longtime relationship with Harvard Divinity School that included cross-registration. It was a member of the Boston Theological Institute, a consortium of seminaries and divinity schools that share library and academic resources and allow cross-registration for courses. From 2010 to 2017, EDS shared part of its campus, offered cross-registration, and pooled resources with Lesley University.

Established to train people for ordination in the Episcopal Church, the seminary also trained students from other denominations; since 2011, members of the Metropolitan Community Church could train for ordination in their church, receiving specific instruction on their church's polity.

Founding

The Episcopal Divinity School (EDS) was founded in 1974 by combining the Episcopal Theological School (ETS) and the Philadelphia Divinity School (PDS). Both institutions were facing bankruptcy at the time and by basing the new school on ETS' campus and otherwise combining resources the new institution was able to ensure a modicum of financial stability.

The Philadelphia Divinity School was founded in Philadelphia in 1857 as the Divinity School of the Protestant Episcopal Church by Alonzo Potter, Bishop of Pennsylvania.

The Episcopal Theological School was founded in Cambridge, Massachusetts, in 1867 by Boston businessman Benjamin Tyler Reed. ETS had from its inception a close relationship with adjacent Harvard University, which was Unitarian at the time. ETS also had a close relationship with PDS. Its first dean was John Seely Stone, who had previously taught at PDS.

Churchmanship
PDS and ETS had both attempted to insulate themselves from affiliations with partisan factions within the church. Where other seminaries that existed or would come to exist within the Episcopal Church often affiliated themselves with either the high church or low church movements, PDS and ETS focused on broad social and academic matters rather than issues of churchmanship as such. This may affiliate them with broad church movements, although neither institution explicitly identified themselves as such. EDS has continued in that tradition.

Social issues

PDS, ETS and EDS have all been known for their focus on pastoral action around progressive social issues.

African-American education
From its inception, PDS admitted and trained African-American students, which was not done anywhere else in the world. The Episcopal Church itself, originally as the Church of England under the Bishop of London in British colonies in North America, had early seen several attempts from within at including African-American and indigenous American peoples in the full life of the church; the first person to be baptized in the Church of England in North America was a Native American person. Social values, particularly with the rise of racial slavery in North America, meant that there were considerable obstacles to such practices, and debates over whether it was right to baptize African-American slaves were 
controversial. Clergy who baptized slaves were often expelled from their parishes by the wealthy vestries which held their contracts.  The church was largely controlled by affluent whites and despite rare actions by clergy, African-American slaves and ex-slaves were largely excluded from participation in the life of the church.

In 1968, ETS hired its first African-American professor, Robert Avon Bennett.

Education and ordination of women
In the 1880s, PDS begin training women as deaconesses. In 1929 women were first admitted at PDS in small numbers to theological education programs designed for those preparing to teach religion in colleges.

ETS became the first Episcopal seminary to hire a woman, in 1941, to its full-time faculty.

In 1974, after the formation of EDS, 11 women known as the Philadelphia Eleven were "irregularly" ordained to the priesthood of the Episcopal Church. Several EDS faculty members took part in the ordination and two of the new priests, Carter Heyward and Suzanne Hiatt, were employed as EDS faculty. The affiliation of EDS with this ordination would cause many bishops to refuse to send their postulants for ordination to EDS to receive a theological education. EDS retained a reputation for controversy stemming from this incident even after the Episcopal Church as a whole voted to ordain women to the priesthood in 1976. EDS quickly became the first Episcopal seminary to have women teaching in all fields of study.

Civil rights
In 1956, Bishop Henry Knox Sherrill, who graduated from ETS in 1914, spoke out at a press conference on September 18, 1956, in favor of racial integration for the whole church. He said, “integration in the whole church is inevitable; it is fundamental to the heart of the Gospel.”

In 1964, members of the ETS community marched in Boston to protest the racially motivated Birmingham church bombings. In the following year, ETS students and faculty traveled to Alabama to take part in the Selma to Montgomery marches. Several students sought to return to Alabama after the Selma marches to continue to work for racial integration in that state.  Jonathan Myrick Daniels, one of those students, was shot and killed outside a store in Hayneville, Alabama, while trying to protect a young African-American woman, Ruby Sales, from a gunman. Sales would go on to attend ETS herself and work for civil rights, founding an inner-city mission dedicated to Daniels who is remembered as a martyr of the Episcopal Church and is remembered regularly at EDS.

LGBT rights

In the 1960s, ETS students who were suspected of being homosexual were dismissed, but as church and social opinion began to slowly turn in favor of tolerance of homosexuals, EDS would become a leading center of studies on LGBT issues within the Episcopal Church and the wider Anglican Communion. In 1974, ethics professor William Hayden McCallum came out as a gay man to the school community. Associate professor and priest Carter Heyward came out as a lesbian to the church in a nationwide publication in 1979. By the 1980s, EDS permitted same-sex couples to live in campus housing as it did heterosexual couples previously. In 1995, when St. John's Memorial Chapel was opened to marriage services by Dean William Rankin, both heterosexual marriages and same-sex unions were permitted, contrary to the trend in the Episcopal Church at the time. In 1999, the school's then dean, Steven Charleston, was the author of the Cambridge Accord, an attempt to reach consensus over the human rights of homosexual people, notwithstanding differences within the Anglican Communion over the moral status of homosexual acts. In 2009, Katherine Hancock Ragsdale became the Dean of EDS, the first openly lesbian person to be dean of an Episcopal seminary. However, in 2015, she indicated she would not seek an extension to her term as Dean – which expired at the end of June – after disputes with faculty regarding changes to the residential seminary model.

Affiliation with Union Theological Seminary and move to New York
In 2016, the school's board of trustees decided that the school would cease granting degrees after the end of the 2016–2017 academic year. After several months of evaluating how it could continue to support the school's mission of theological education, the board of trustees decided to affiliate EDS with Union Theological Seminary in New York City and sell its Cambridge campus. All of EDS' current students were transferred to other institutions, and contracts with all faculty and staff were ended. Despite being heralded as a "relocation," not a single human being from EDS in Cambridge was employed at Union. The City of Cambridge had expressed interest in reusing the campus for affordable housing. However, under the terms of a contract approved by the EDS board in 2010, Lesley University co-owned the campus and EDS could not sell the property without its permission. In 2018, Lesley purchased the rest of EDS's former Cambridge campus, making Lesley the sole owner. The move to Union, and thus New York, occurred despite the proximate location of the long-standing General Theological Seminary there.

Deans

Episcopal Theological School
 1867 Francis Wharton
 1876–1889 George Zabriskie Gray
 1889–1893 William Lawrence
 1894–1919 George Hodges
 1920–1940 Henry Bradford Washburn
 1940–1944 Angus Dun
 1944-1956 Charles Taylor   <episcopal news service Dec 20, 1979>
 1957–1968 John B. Coburn
 1969–1974 Harvey H. Guthrie

Episcopal Divinity School
 1974–1976 Harvey H. Guthrie and Edward Harris
 1976–1985 Harvey H. Guthrie
 1985–1993 E. Otis Charles
 1993–1998 William Rankin
 1999–2008 Steven Charleston
 2009–2015 Katherine Hancock Ragsdale
 2018–present Kelly Brown Douglas

See also

 List of Episcopal Divinity School people

References

Further reading
A History of Episcopal Divinity School: In celebration of its 25th anniversary by Matthew Peter Cadwell, published by The Trustees of the Episcopal Divinity School, 2000
Installation Address by Katherine Hancock Ragsdale, Dean and President of Episcopal Divinity School, October 23, 2009
A Brief History of the Episcopal Church by David L. Holmes

External links
 Official website 

 
Episcopal Church (United States)
Anglican seminaries and theological colleges
Seminaries and theological colleges in Massachusetts
Educational institutions established in 1974
Universities and colleges in Cambridge, Massachusetts
Episcopal Church in Massachusetts
Harvard Square
1974 establishments in Massachusetts
Educational institutions disestablished in 2017
2017 disestablishments in Massachusetts
Union Theological Seminary (New York City)